Zoo Road is a locality in central part of Guwahati surrounded by Chandmari and AIDC localities.

See also
 Pan Bazaar
 Paltan Bazaar
 Beltola

From Chandmari to Ganeshguri, the road is known as Zoo Road, because the road is connected to Assam State Zoo.

References

Neighbourhoods in Guwahati